George Rae is a British doctor and one of the presenters of the television programme Street Doctor, a prime time medical reality TV series on BBC One. The programme began its second series in 2008.

He practises in Whitley Bay in the north-east of England.

He is a member of the BMA Council.

References
Docs on the box go up in the world, Strathspey Herald (UK), March 5, 2008
Helen Rae, Strolling docs help to boost health message, Evening Chronicle (UK), Aug 27 2007

External links
Street Doctor website

British television presenters
Living people
Year of birth missing (living people)
21st-century British medical doctors